Misshapen-like kinase 1 is an enzyme that in humans is encoded by the MINK1 gene.

Function 

Misshapen-like kinase 1 is  a serine/threonine kinase belonging to the germinal center kinase (GCK) family. The protein is structurally similar to the kinases that are related to NIK and may belong to a distinct subfamily of NIK-related kinases within the GCK family. Studies of the mouse homolog indicate an up-regulation of expression in the course of postnatal mouse cerebral development and activation of the cJun N-terminal kinase (JNK) and the p38 pathways. Alternative splicing occurs at this locus and four transcript variants encoding distinct isoforms have been identified.

Interactions 

MINK1 has been shown to interact with NCK1.

References

Further reading